WFLF-FM (94.5 FM) is a radio station broadcasting in Panama City, Florida, owned and operated by iHeartMedia.

History
WFLF-FM first signed on at 93.5 MHz in 1977 as WGCV, a station licensed to Port St Joe, Florida. In 1982, Don Crisp bought WGCV (as well as AM station WJOE 1080), moved, and upgraded the FM signal to 94.5 with 100 kW of power. The stations were sold in 1983 to Brown Broadcasting (affiliated with John Brown University of Siloam Springs, Arkansas). WGCV changed their calls to WJST. WJOE's calls were changed to WJBU, where they would stay until the station's last days in 1989. WJST was originally a rock station called "T-94". Initially, WJST was on a shorter, 500-foot tower (alongside WJBU), but in 1986 WJST moved to a 1,000-foot tower.  Brown sold the stations to Champion in 1986, who immediately sold the stations to Asterisk, Inc. WJST then became a country station, but proved unable to compete effectively with the already established WPAP. WJST had a call letter change to WWZR in 1989, and adopted SMN's "Z Rock" format. This format only lasted until January 28, 1990, when it switched to Southern Gospel music.

From 1991 until 1993, the station was a member of Westwood One's Real Country network. In 1993, the station's calls were changed again to WKNB. Marketed as "B94.5", WKNB aired a modern country format for just under a year, when in 1994 its calls were changed to WPBH and it operated under the name "Beach 94.5" for three years. In 1997, WPBH (as well as WPAP, WDIZ, and WFSY) was sold to ClearChannel (now iHeartMedia) and its callsign was changed again to WPPT. It was the second station in the Panama City market to have the "Pirate Radio" moniker (the first being WTBB from 1992 to 1997), and existed until 2002. In 2002, the station flipped to an active rock format called "The Fox 94.5" and its calls were changed to WFBX. This lasted until 2007, when, after the calls were changed to WFLF-FM, the station became an affiliate of Fox News Radio, cross-branding itself with sister station WFLA in the Tampa Bay area and sharing much of WFLA's conservative talk radio lineup from iHeart's Premiere Networks.

On September 15, 2021, WFLF-FM began stunting with Christmas music, branded as "Christmas 94.5". In addition, the WFLA programming moved to two FM translators, fed by WPAP-HD2. At 5 p.m. on September 17, WFLF-FM flipped to mainstream rock, branded as "Rock 94.5".

References

External links
WFLF-FM Official Website

FLF-FM
Radio stations established in 2001
IHeartMedia radio stations
2001 establishments in Florida
Mainstream rock radio stations in the United States